Sophiasburgh is an historic township in southern Ontario, Canada, one of the three original townships that formed Prince Edward County. The other two townships were Ameliasburgh and Marysburgh. It was named in 1798 after Princess Sophia, the fifth daughter of George III. The township was amalgamated into the Corporation of the County of Prince Edward, a single tier municipality, on January 1, 1998.

After the American Revolution, a number of United Empire Loyalists who settled in the area of Picton Bay. The White Chapel, north of Picton, was the  first Methodist church built in the county.

See also
List of townships in Ontario

References

Former township municipalities in Ontario
Geography of Prince Edward County, Ontario
Populated places disestablished in 1998
History of Prince Edward County, Ontario